The Buckeye School, in Larimer County, Colorado near Wellington, Colorado, now known as the Buckeye Community Center, was a rural two-room schoolhouse built in 1925.  It was used as a school until 1960.  It was listed on the National Register of Historic Places in 2008.

The main floor's open space could be used as a single classroom if a moveable, wooden, folding partition was opened. The partition, which has a door at each end, was used to separate older, upper grade students from younger, lower grade ones, when enrollment justified.

A basement level held a kitchen, two storage areas, and a teacher's living quarters. Around 1944, when wood stoves had been replaced by butane stoves and when plumbing was installed, the storage areas were converted into girls' and boys' restrooms.

The school demonstrates features of post-1920s school design, including clustered windows on the south side of the building providing light coming in behind schoolchildren facing north.

It was named "Buckeye School" for the buckeye trees which grew in its area, although theyare rare in Colorado.

A contributing site in the listing is a playground area holding surviving merry-go-round, swing set, teeter totter, slide and flagpole, on the south side of the building.

It was built by contract-winner O.A. Decker at final cost of $4,983.17.  An original small stable and two original privvies are no longer present.

References

National Register of Historic Places in Larimer County, Colorado
School buildings completed in 1925
School buildings on the National Register of Historic Places in Colorado
Two-room schoolhouses